Seven Brides for Seven Brothers is an American musical television series, loosely based on the 1954 film of the same name, which ran on CBS from September 19, 1982 to March 23, 1983.

Synopsis
The series told the adventures of a parentless family of rowdy brothers trying to run the family ranch in northern California.  Into the chaos came feisty Hannah, who married Adam and took on the task of bringing order to the household.  The series contained about one musical number per episode, written by notable songwriter Jimmy Webb.  Despite a small but dedicated fan following, the series was cancelled after one season.

Cast
Richard Dean Anderson as 27 year old Adam McFadden, eldest of the McFadden brothers who is married to Hannah. He is strong, responsible and true and does what he can to keep the family together.
Drake Hogestyn as 25 year old Brian McFadden, second of the McFadden brothers who helped raise the younger ones.  He’s a true cowboy with a quick temper and stubborn pride loving his family and the land. He often cooks the meals and looks after his younger brothers. Despite being somewhat stubborn and having his way with the ladies, Brian is loyal and supportive towards his brothers.
Peter Horton as 23 year old Crane McFadden, third of the McFadden brothers and a loyal, hardworking responsible rancher on the ranch, who takes care of the financials.  His love interest is Molly McGraw, a veterinarian.
Roger Wilson as 18 year old Daniel McFadden, fourth of the McFadden brothers who has a passion for music and writing his own songs. He is fun loving, caring and loyal. His temporary love interest is Allison Freely in one episode while in high school.
Tim Topper as 17 year old Evan McFadden, fifth of the McFadden brothers who dreams of becoming a rodeo bronc rider like his hero Cooper Johnson. He is spirited McFadden that flares up when he is passionate about things. He makes friends with Coop Johnson’s daughter Jill, one of the girls who practices with him at the rodeo.
Brian Utman as 16 year old Ford McFadden, sixth of the McFadden brothers. He is the quiet, meek and shyer McFadden, who likes animals and Cleo Wheeler, daughter of the scheming cattle rancher Mr. Wheeler.
River Phoenix as 12 year old Guthrie McFadden, seventh and youngest of the McFadden brothers who loves being outdoors, exploring and getting his hands dirty. He is loyal, courageous always wants to do what his bigger brothers are doing. He has a couple of friends, one of them is Kate Bancroft, a 12-year-old girl who enjoys the outdoors and catching frogs as much as Guthrie does.
Terri Treas as 24 year old Hannah McFadden, wife of Adam McFadden and sister-in-law of Adam’s six younger brothers. She is spirited, take charge kinda of gal, and fits right into the family and appreciates the brothers for their musical talents.
Pamela Newman as Jackie
Joan Kjar as Marie

Production
Seven Brides for Seven Brothers was executive produced by David Gerber for MGM Television and filmed on location at Murphys, California. The series' theme, "Seven Brides for Seven Brothers", was written by Jimmy Webb and performed by Phil Silas. The musical numbers were choreographed by Carl Jablonski. Michael J. Fox auditioned for this show, before auditioning successfully for Family Ties.

Episodes

Reception

Ratings

Awards and nominations

References

External links

1980s American drama television series
1980s American music television series
1982 American television series debuts
1983 American television series endings
CBS original programming
English-language television shows
Live action television shows based on films
Television series by MGM Television
Television series based on adaptations
Television shows set in California
Television series about brothers